ELRA may refer to:
 European Land Registry Association
 European Language Resources Association